The Washington Road Elm Allée is a  stretch of Washington Road in West Windsor, New Jersey that is lined with Princeton Elm trees.  The allée runs through the West Windsor fields of Princeton University and provides, along with the bridge over Lake Carnegie, a dramatic entrance to the campus.  The Delaware and Raritan Canal can be found at the northern end of the allée, just before the lake.  A jogging path runs through the allée and connects to the canal towpath, the main campus of the university, and other trails through the adjacent fields.

History

Elm Allée

The original allée was planted in the mid-1920s by Princeton Nurseries, at one time the country's largest commercial plant nursery. The Elm trees are of the Princeton variety, developed by Princeton Nurseries for its landscaping quality, and are resistant to Dutch elm disease, the only one of ten resistant cultivars to have trees that have reached maturity. Of the original 136 Elms planted in the 1920s only 76 survive. Their branches meet over the roadway to provide a leafy canopy. The allée has many replacement trees, including 16 Norway maples planted in the 1960s, and 31 Liberty elms planted in 1995. The secondary rows of Delaware Elms were planted in 1983, and a long row of forsythia to the east is thought to date from the late 1960s.

Schenck-Covenhoven Burial Ground

To the east of the Elm Allée,  from the road, along the jogging path, can be found the Schenck-Covenhoven Burial Ground, sometimes called the Old Conover Graveyard.  It contains forty or fifty graves surrounded by a stone wall and is undoubtedly the oldest cemetery in West Windsor Township, with burials dating to at least 1751.  The Schenck and Covenhoven families were Dutch farmers who purchased  in what is now West Windsor from William Penn in 1737.  The Conover family was among the original settlers in Penns Neck, a settlement found at the south end of the allée.  The cemetery has been in disuse for more than a century, though it receives some maintenance from the university.

Gallery

See also

National Register of Historic Places listings in Mercer County, New Jersey

References

National Register of Historic Places in Mercer County, New Jersey
West Windsor, New Jersey
Princeton University
Landscape architecture
New Jersey Register of Historic Places